Patrick Robson de Souza Monteiro (born 11 May 1998) is a Brazilian professional footballer who plays as a forward for Kategoria Superiore club Tirana.

Club career
On 9 July 2021 he joined Admira Wacker in Austria.

On 11 January 2022, Gabala announced the signing of Patrick on loan from Admira Wacker until the summer of 2023. On 11 July 2022, Gabala announced that Patrick's loan had been ended early.

Career statistics

Club

Honours

Club 
Tirana
Albanian Supercup: 2022

References

External links
Profile at the Horn website

1998 births
Living people
Brazilian footballers
Association football forwards
SV Horn players
FC Admira Wacker Mödling players
2. Liga (Austria) players
Austrian Football Bundesliga players
Brazilian expatriate footballers
Expatriate footballers in Austria